Deolinda Rodrigues Francisco de Almeida (nom de guerre, Langidila; honorary title, "Mother of the Revolution"; 10 February 1939 – 2 March 1967) was an Angolan nationalist, militant, writer, and translator, who also taught, wrote poetry, and worked as a radio host. Born into a Methodist family, she received a scholarship to study in Brazil, from where she corresponded with Martin Luther King Jr. Fearing extradition, she continued her education in the United States before returning to Angola. Rodrigues was a member of the People's Movement for the Liberation of Angola (MPLA) and co-founded its women's wing, the Organização da Mulher de Angola (Organization of Angolan Women; OMA). She was captured, tortured, and executed by a rival nationalist group in 1967. A documentary of her life was released in 2014.

Early life and education
Deolinda Rodrigues Francisco de Almeida was born in Catete, Angola, on 10 February 1939. Her Methodist parents were schoolteachers, and she was a middle child, with four other siblings, including a brother, Roberto de Almeida. 

She moved to Luanda and lived with her cousin, the poet Agostinho Neto, who went on to become the first president of Angola. Though she was educated in the Methodist Missionary schools and taught writing and translating while a young girl, by the late 1950s, she had begun to question the paternal attitude of both the government and the church. 

In 1956, Rodrigues joined the MPLA as a translator. While a sociology student on scholarship at Methodist University of São Paulo in 1959, she exchanged correspondence with Martin Luther King Jr. Fearing she would be extradited from Brazil because of the Portuguese Imperial relationship between its colonies and her support of the growing Angolan Independence movement, Rodrigues moved to the United States the following year and studied at Drew University. Because she wanted to be an active participant in Angola's independence, Rodríguez returned to Angola without finishing her studies.

Career
In February 1961, she was recruited to participate in the MPLA attack on "Fortalesa", later gaining the honorary title of "Mother of the Revolution". Rodrigues traveled to Guinea-Bissau and Congo Kinshasa, where she co-founded the Organização da Mulher de Angola (Organization of Angolan Women; OMA), the women's division of the MPLA. She received guerrilla training in Kabinda, and joined the Esquadrão Kamy. She returned to Angola in 1962. As a revolutionary movement leader and activist, she campaigned for human rights in Angola, and was associated with the Corpo Voluntário Angolano de Assistência aos Refugiados (CVAAR). In 1963, the government expelled the MPLA leadership, forcing them to flee to Brazzaville. Her writings from the time show an increasing move towards Marxism–Leninism and a painful awareness that her womanhood made her invisible even though she was part of the leadership. She expressed her frustration at the discrimination she faced for her lack of domesticity, saying that she was treated as if being single was "shameful or of the devil".

Pushed out of Brazzaville, the MPLA moved to the border with Cabinda in 1966, where fighting intensified over the next two years.

Death and legacy
Rodrigues and four other OMA members (Engracia dos Santos, Irene Cohen, Lucrecia Paim, and Teresa Afonso) were captured by the União dos Povos de Angola (UPA) guerrilla group (later, National Liberation Front of Angola) on 2 March 1967. They were tortured and dismembered alive. Taken to the FNLA camp, Kinkuzu, in the Democratic Republic of the Congo, Rodrigues was executed in prison.

Posthumously, her diary was published in 2003 under the title Diário de um exilio sem regresso and her letters and correspondence were published in 2004 as Cartas de Langidila e outros documentos. In 2010, a documentary of her life was begun. Filmed in Angola, Brazil and Mozambique, the film interviews associates and incorporates text from Rodrigues's diaries. It took four years for the documentary to reach completion. Langidila—diário de um exílio sem regresso (Langidila—Diary of an exile without return) was released in 2014 and gives the story of the independence of Angola from the perspective of Rodrigues and her companions. In 2011, Marcia Hinds Gleckler, who had served in the Methodist Missionary Movement in the 1950s, wrote an on-line memoir and book entitled Dear Deolinda of their time together, her recollections and reflections of the era.

Selected works

See also
Congo Crisis

References

Bibliography

Further reading
 Alfieri, N. (2021). "Deolinda Rodrigues: between historical and biographical writing. Reception of an Angolan fighter and intellectual". Abriu: Estudos De Textualidade Do Brasil, Galicia E Portugal, (10), 39–57. https://doi.org/10.1344./abriu2021.10.2

External links
 Dear Deolinda
 Correspondence between Martin Luther King, Jr. and Deolinda Rodrigues at Stanford University

1939 births
1968 deaths
20th-century Angolan poets
20th-century women writers
20th-century letter writers
Drew University alumni
MPLA politicians
People from Luanda Province
Angolan independence activists
Angolan women activists
Executed revolutionaries
Angolan women poets
Torture victims
Women letter writers
African women in war
Methodist University of São Paulo alumni
Organization founders
Women founders
Violence against women in the Democratic Republic of the Congo